Cybister javanus, is a species of predaceous diving beetle found in India, Sri Lanka and Indonesia.

References 

Dytiscidae
Insects of Sri Lanka
Insects described in 1838